Sharemilking, a form of sharefarming, operates in the dairy industry. The application of this model of agriculture occurs particularly commonly in New Zealand. 

The most common arrangement is herd-owning sharemilking or 50:50 sharemilking. Sharemilkers own their own herd and equipment, and are responsible for employing workers and the day-to-day operations of the farm. In return, herd-owning sharemilkers receive a percentage of the milk income, normally 50%. In variable order sharemilking, sharemilkers do not own their own herd, and receive a lower percentage of the milk income. Contract milking is similar to variable order sharemilking, except the sharemilkers are  paid a fixed price per kilogram of milk solids.

Sharemilking contracts typically run from 1 June to 31 May; when sharemilkers take up new contracts, the herd is often shifted on what is known as "Gypsy Day". 

The model is not exploitative, and over time, sharemilkers often slowly buy out the landholder, or alternatively use the system as a method to save for their own property. This practice helps dairy farmers anywhere who do not wish the burdens of owning their own land, as it allows them to focus their investment in livestock and equipment. Sharemilking also profits former dairy farmers who have given up their herds, by providing them with an income from rental of fields, pastures and barns.

See also
 Sharecropping
 Sharefarming
 Dairy farming in New Zealand

References

Dairy farming
Dairy farming in New Zealand